Punto may refer to:

In music:
 Punto (Venezuela), a style of Venezuelan music
 Punto guajiro, a style of music of the Cuban countryside and its guajiros
 Punto music, a style of Panamanian music

In automobiles:
 Fiat Punto, supermini produced since 1993
 Fiat Grande Punto, third generation supermini produced from 2005

In people:
 Giovanni Punto (1746-1803), eighteenth century horn virtuoso
 Nick Punto (born 1977), American baseball player for the Boston Red Sox

Unit
Punto, Spanish customary units

Italian-language surnames
Spanish-language surnames